The 2016 Atlantic Coast Conference men's soccer tournament is the 30th edition of the ACC Men's Soccer Tournament. The tournament decides the Atlantic Coast Conference champion and guaranteed representative into the 2016 NCAA Division I Men's Soccer Championship.

Qualification 

All twelve teams in the Atlantic Coast Conference earned a berth into the ACC Tournament. All rounds are held at the higher seed's home field.  The championship match will be held in Charleston, S.C. on November 13.

Bracket

Schedule

First round

Quarterfinals

Semifinals

Finals

All-Tournament team

Statistics

Goalscorers
3 goals

 Zeiko Lewis – Boston College

2 goals

 Tim Kübel – Louisville
 Jonathan Hagman – Syracuse
 Chris Nanco – Syracuse
 Alessandro Mion – Virginia Tech
 Jacori Hayes – Wake Forest

1 goal

 Diego Campos – Clemson
 Tanner Dieterich – Clemson
 Alexandre Happi – Clemson
 Cameron Mosley- Duke
 Carter Manley – Duke
 Brandon Aubrey – Notre Dame
 Jeffery Farina – Notre Dame
 Jon Gallagher – Notre Dame
 Sergio Camargo – Syracuse
 Pablo Aguilar – Virginia
 Steven Echevarria – Wake Forest
 Ian Harkes – Wake Forest
 Hayden Partain – Wake Forest
 Ema Twumasi – Wake Forest

See also 
 Atlantic Coast Conference
 2016 Atlantic Coast Conference men's soccer season
 2016 NCAA Division I men's soccer season
 2016 NCAA Division I Men's Soccer Championship

References 

ACC Men's Soccer Tournament
Tournament
ACC Men's Soccer Tournament